Terry Evans may refer to:

 Terry Evans (wrestler) (1911–?), Canadian freestyle sport wrestler
 Terry Evans (musician) (1937–2018), American R&B, blues, and soul singer, guitarist and songwriter
 Terry Evans (footballer, born 1965), English professional footballer
 Terry Evans (footballer, born 1976), Welsh professional footballer
 Terry Evans (baseball) (born 1982), American baseball outfielder
 Terry Evans (photographer) (born 1944), American photographer

See also
Terence T. Evans (1940–2011), American judge
Terrence Evans (1934–2015), American actor